Lyric Legend is a game designed for Android, iOS, and BlackBerry devices. The game received over 1 million downloads on iOS during its launch in 2010.

A sequel, Lyric Legend 2, was later released.

References

Android (operating system) games
IOS games